Fitzpatrick v British Railways Board [1992] ICR 221 is a UK labour law case, concerning collective bargaining.

Facts
Ms Fitzpatrick concealed a period of employment when she was working for Ford, but was dismissed after 9 days for bad references. An Evening Standard article had revealed, after she had been working for a few months with the British Railways Board, she had been a member of a Trotskyist group called Socialist Action (UK). She was dismissed for ‘untruthfulness and lack of trust’. Ms Fitzpatrick claimed the dismissal was unlawful, as it was because of her trade union activity.

Judgment
Woolf LJ held that Ms Fitzpatrick was unlawfully dismissed under the Employment Protection (Consolidation) Act 1978 section 58 (now TULRCA 1992 section 152), and reversed the Tribunal. She was dismissed not for ‘deceit’ but because of her ‘previous trade union (and possibly her political) activities, which gave her a reputation for being a disruptive force; and that was the prime reason for her dismissal.’

Dillon LJ and Leggatt LJ concurred.

See also

UK labour law

Notes

References

United Kingdom labour case law
Court of Appeal (England and Wales) cases
1992 in British law
1992 in case law